Jonathan de Falco (born 8 October 1984) is a Belgian former footballer who is last known to have played as a defender for KRC Mechelen.

Career

In 2007, de Falco signed for Belgian second tier side Deinze. At the age of 26, he retired from professional football due to injury. After that, he worked as a Gay pornography actor under the pseudonym Stany Falcone.

References

1984 births
Association football defenders
Challenger Pro League players
Belgian footballers
Belgian National Division 1 players
Gay pornographic film actors
Belgian gay actors
K.M.S.K. Deinze players
Belgium LGBT sportspeople
Living people